Bordères is a commune in the Pyrénées-Atlantiques department, in the administrative region of Nouvelle-Aquitaine, southwestern France.

Personalities
It is the birthplace of French politician François Bayrou.

See also
Communes of the Pyrénées-Atlantiques department

References

Communes of Pyrénées-Atlantiques
Pyrénées-Atlantiques communes articles needing translation from French Wikipedia